Cecilia D'Anastasio is an American journalist who primarily covers the video game industry. From 2016 to 2020, D'Anastasio wrote for Kotaku, and she was recognized for a 2018 article reporting allegations of sexual harassment and gender discrimination at Riot Games. Subsequently, she wrote for Wired magazine and joined Bloomberg News in 2022 to cover the video game industry.

Education and early career 
D'Anastasio studied at Reed College, where she received a degree in classics. D'Anastasio did freelance work for several publications, including The Nation, before joining Kotaku as a staff writer in June 2016.

Career

At Kotaku 

D'Anastasio focused on investigative stories as a staff writer for Kotaku.

Her article "Inside The Culture Of Sexism At Riot Games", published in August 2018, details allegations of sexual harassment and gender discrimination at Riot Games according to the accounts of twenty-eight current and former employees. Following its publication, current and former employees also shared their own experiences regarding workplace harassment on social media. On the day of the publication, Riot Games released a statement generally addressing its workplace culture, hiring practices, and diversity and inclusion program in response to the allegations detailed in the article. Later that month, the company released a statement outlining its "first steps" towards addressing the allegations.

At the 71st Writers Guild of America Awards, D'Anastasio was presented with the Digital News award for the article. Variety described the article as "the most important piece of games reporting of the year, and maybe even years", naming D'Anastasio as one of the "Most Influential in Video Games" for the year of 2018. In the following year, the New York Videogame Critics Circle presented her with their "Knickerbocker Award for Best Games Journalism". D'Anastasio also made an appearance on Patriot Act with Hasan Minhaj, where she spoke about labor issues in the video game industry and her investigative work on Riot Games.

D'Anastasio left the publication in December 2019.

At Wired 
D'Anastasio was hired as a staff writer for Wired magazine in 2020. In March, she received SXSW's inaugural Journalist of the Year award at the 2020 Gaming Awards for her "groundbreaking and influential" coverage of the video game industry. In October, the magazine launched its Wired Games section, which covers the video game industry. The section features work written by various staff writers including D'Anastasio. Later that year, Forbes named her to its 30 Under 30 list in the media category.

At Bloomberg News 
After two years writing for Wired magazine, at the beginning of 2022 D'Anastasio joined Bloomberg News to cover the video game industry.

References

External links 
 

American critics
American investigative journalists
American magazine staff writers
American online journalists
Bloomberg L.P. people
Reed College alumni
Women in the video game industry
Women video game critics
Living people
Year of birth missing (living people)